The Heinrich Greif Prize (German: Heinrich-Greif-Preis) was an East German state award bestowed on individuals for contribution to the state's cinema and television industry.

History
The prize was awarded by the East German Ministry of Culture for "outstanding achievements in Socialist-Realist cinema and television" and was presented annually to directors, cinematographers, writers and other filmmakers who were recognized for creating valued works in the field. It had three classes, and originally could be bestowed only in collective, to a group of producers. Since 1959, awards for single persons were also granted. The recipients were given a silver medal, a diploma and a sum of money, which varied from 7,500 East German Mark to 20,000. Since 1973, the medals were no longer made of silver.

Established at 17 May 1951 in memory of actor Heinrich Greif, it was first awarded on 25 May that year. The 1st class was received by the creators of The Eyewitness newsreel series, the 2nd Class by the production team of the documentary The Way Upwards and the 3rd was given to the makers of a series of popular science films.

The prize's presentation ceremony mostly took place on 11 March, Greif's birthday. It was awarded for the last time in 1989.

Notable recipients
Ulrich Plenzdorf (awarded 1971)
Frank Beyer (1961, 1984)
Heiner Carow (1959, 1967)
Heinz Kahlau (1962)
Herbert Köfer (1964)
Manfred Krug (1962)
Kurt Jung-Alsen (1973)
Vasily Livanov (1969)
Günter Reisch (1978)
Günther Rücker (1966)
Helga Schubert (1983)
Günther Simon (1955)
Lothar Warneke (1971, 1983)
Job von Witzleben (1966)

References

External links
A photo of the Heinrich Greif Prize's medal, in a list of East German prizes.
DEFA's annual chronicle 1945–1989, with all the prize winners listed.

German film awards
German television awards
Awards established in 1951
Awards disestablished in 1989
Orders, decorations, and medals of East Germany
1951 establishments in East Germany
1989 disestablishments in East Germany